In mathematics and statistics, a random number is either Pseudo-random or a number generated for, or part of, a set exhibiting statistical randomness.

Algorithms and implementations
A 1964-developed algorithm is popularly known as the Knuth shuffle or the Fisher–Yates shuffle (based on work they did in 1938). A real-world use for this is sampling water quality in a reservoir.

In 1999, a new feature was added to the Pentium III: a hardware-based random number generator. It has been described as "several oscillators combine their outputs and that odd waveform is sampled asynchronously." These numbers, however, were only 32 bit, at a time when export controls were on 56 bits and higher, so they were not state of the art.

Common understanding
In common understanding, "1 2 3 4 5" is not as random as "3 5 2 1 4" and certainly not as random as "47 88 1 32 41" but "we can't say authoritavely that the first sequence is not random ... it could have been generated by chance."

When a police officer claims to have done a "random .. door-to-door" search, there is a certain expectation that members of a jury will have.

Real world consequences
Flaws in randomness have real-world consequences.

A 99.8% randomness was shown by researchers to negatively affect an estimated 27,000 customers of a large service and that the problem was not limited to just that situation.

See also
 Algorithmically random sequence
 Quasi-random sequence
 Random number generation
 Random sequence
 Random variable
 Random variate
 Random real

References

Permutations